The Albert Einstein Award (sometimes mistakenly called the Albert Einstein Medal because it was accompanied with a gold medal) was an award in theoretical physics, given periodically from 1951 to 1979, that was established to recognize high achievement in the natural sciences. It was endowed by the Lewis and Rosa Strauss Memorial Fund in honor of Albert Einstein's 70th birthday. It was first awarded in 1951 and, in addition to a gold medal of Einstein by sculptor Gilroy Roberts, it also included a prize money of $15,000, which was later reduced to $5,000. The winner was selected by a committee (the first of which consisted of Einstein, Oppenheimer, von Neumann, and Weyl) of the Institute for Advanced Study, which administered the award. Lewis L. Strauss used to be one of the trustees of the institute.

This award should not be confused with many others named after the famous physicist, such as the Albert Einstein World Award of Science given by the World Cultural Council (since 1984), the Albert Einstein Medal given by the Albert Einstein Society (since 1979), nor with the Hans Albert Einstein Award, named after his son and given by the American Society of Civil Engineers (since 1988). It was established much earlier than these, while Einstein was still alive and was a professor at the Institute for Advanced Study. It has been called "the highest of its kind in the United States" by The New York Times. Some considered it as "the prestigious equivalent of a Nobel Prize".

Recipients

See also

 List of physics awards

References

External links 
 Information on the Albert Einstein Award from the Jewish-American Hall of Fame
 Information about and photos of the medal awarded to Kurt Godel on the website of the Institute for Advanced Study, last accessed 2020-04-18.

Physics awards
Awards established in 1951
Awards disestablished in 1979
Albert Einstein